Natacha Estefania Pérez (born 30 March 1991) is an Argentine basketball player for Las Heras Mendoza and the Argentina women's national basketball team.

She defended Argentina at the 2018 FIBA Women's Basketball World Cup.

References

External links

1991 births
Living people
Argentine women's basketball players
Basketball players at the 2019 Pan American Games
Pan American Games 3x3 basketball players
Small forwards
Pan American Games medalists in basketball
Pan American Games silver medalists for Argentina
Medalists at the 2019 Pan American Games
Sportspeople from Mendoza Province